The following is an alphabetical list of members of the United States House of Representatives from the state of Idaho.  For chronological tables of members of both houses of the United States Congress from the state (through the present day), see United States congressional delegations from Idaho.  It includes members who have represented both the state and the territory, both past and present.

Current members
. 

 : Russ Fulcher (R) (since 2019)
 : Mike Simpson (R) (since 1999)

List of members and delegates

Key

Recent and upcoming elections

Federal
Presidential: 2012, 2016, 2020
Senatorial: 2010, 2014, 2016, 2020, 2022
Congressional: 2010, 2012, 2014, 2016, 2018, 2020

State
General: 2014, 2020
Gubernatorial: 2010, 2014, 2018
Legislature: 2006, 2020

See also

List of United States senators from Idaho
United States congressional delegations from Idaho
Idaho's congressional districts

References

Idaho
 
United States Rep